Mark Anatolyevich Zakharov (13 October 1933 – 28 September 2019) was a Soviet and Russian stage and film director, screenwriter and pedagogue best known for his fantasy parable movies. He was named People's Artist of the USSR in 1991.

Zakharov served as the artistic director at the Lenkom Theatre from 1973 till his death. He gathered a "dream team" of actors and reestablished Lenkom as one of the leading Soviet theatres.

Life and career
Mark Zakharov was born in Moscow into a family of teachers. His paternal grandfather Boris Shirinkin belonged to Russian nobility and was killed in action during the World War I, while his paternal grandmother belonged to Crimean Karaites. His father Anatoly Shirinkin served as a Red Army soldier during the Russian Civil War, then worked as a school teacher in physical culture before being arrested in 1934 for counter-revolutionary activity and sentenced to three years in prison; he took part in the Great Patriotic War and in 1949 was expelled from Moscow again for several years as "previously convicted".

Zakharov's mother Galina Sergeevna Zakharova (née Bardina) was a trained actress who led children's acting classes. His maternal grandfather Sergei Nikolaevich Bardin was a White officer who fought under Alexander Kolchak before leaving for Australia; his wife Sophia Nikolaevna Bardina chose to stay in Russia and headed an orphanage. As Zakharov himself wrote, "[I] always considered myself Russian, even though my father admitted that we also had Tatar blood.

Zakharov was raised in Moscow, where he was encouraged by his mother in his persistent efforts to become an actor. He was admitted after several attempts, and graduated from the acting school of the State Theatre Institute in 1955.

Zakharov was the Artistic Director of Moscow's Lenkom Theatre since 1973, where he helped to define the landscape of Moscow's theatrical culture. Zakharov helped create an ensemble of actors who worked with him at Lenkom, including: Yevgeny Leonov, Inna Churikova, Leonid Bronevoy, Oleg Yankovsky, Aleksandr Abdulov, Nikolai Karachentsov, Tatyana Pelttser, Aleksandr Zbruyev, Aleksandra Zakharova, Tatyana Kravchenko, Aleksandr Lazarev, and Dmitry Pevtsov.

His name appeared on a petition opposing Russian annexation of Crimea, however, he himself denied ever signing it. He stated in an interview that he opposed Russian soldiers being deployed to Ukraine as it reminded him the start of the Afghanistan conflict, however, he also couldn't imagine Russia without Crimea. He also stated that had he been offered to sign a letter supporting the annexation, he would've signed it.

Mark Zakharov died in Moscow on 28 September 2019, 15 days before his 86th birthday. He was buried at the Novodevichy Cemetery near Stanislav Govorukhin, Leonid Bronevoy and Oleg Tabakov.

Musical productions
 Juno and Avos, a rock opera

Filmography
 Train Stop — Two Minutes (1972)
 Wake Up and Sing (TV, 1974)
 The Captivating Star of Happiness (1975) (screenplay)
 The Twelve Chairs (1976)
 An Ordinary Miracle (1978)
 The Very Same Munchhausen (1979)
 The House That Swift Built (1983)
 Formula of Love (1984)
 To Kill a Dragon (1988)
 Balakirev the Buffoon (2002)

Honours and awards

 Order of Friendship of Peoples
 Order of Merit for the Fatherland;
1st class (13 October 2008) – for outstanding contribution to the development of domestic theatrical art and many years of creative activity
2nd class (11 October 2003) – for outstanding contribution to the development of theatrical arts
3rd class (26 April 1997) – for services to the state and the great personal contribution to the development of theatrical art
4th class (13 September 2013)
 Honored Art Worker of the RSFSR (1977)
 People's Artist of the USSR (1991)
 USSR State Prize (1987) – for the production of plays in the Lenkom Theatre
 Russian Federation State Prize (1992, 1997, 2002)
 National Award "Musical Heart of Theatre" (2007) – Winner of the Grand Award for outstanding creative achievement in the field of musical theatre
 Honorary Member of the Russian Academy of Arts
 International Stanislavsky Theatre Award (2010) – "for his contribution to the development of Russian theatre"
 The minor planet 5359 Markzakharov was named in his honour
 Hero of Labour of the Russian Federation (2018)

See also
 Grigori Gorin, the playwright of many Zakharov's plays and films

References

External links

1933 births
2019 deaths
20th-century Russian dramatists and playwrights
20th-century Russian male writers
Writers from Moscow
Academicians of the National Academy of Motion Picture Arts and Sciences of Russia
Academicians of the Russian Academy of Cinema Arts and Sciences "Nika"
Communist Party of the Soviet Union members
Honorary Members of the Russian Academy of Arts
Academic staff of Perm State University
People's Artists of the RSFSR
People's Artists of the USSR
Full Cavaliers of the Order "For Merit to the Fatherland"
Recipients of the Order of Friendship of Peoples
Recipients of the USSR State Prize
State Prize of the Russian Federation laureates
Russian film directors
Russian male dramatists and playwrights
Russian male writers
20th-century Russian screenwriters
Male screenwriters
Theatre directors from Moscow
Soviet dramatists and playwrights
Soviet film directors
Soviet male writers
Soviet screenwriters
Soviet theatre directors
Deaths from pneumonia in Russia
Burials at Novodevichy Cemetery